Mike Shelton (born February 28, 1973) is an American politician who served in the Oklahoma House of Representatives from the 97th district from 2004 to 2016.

References

1973 births
Living people
Politicians from Tulsa, Oklahoma
Democratic Party members of the Oklahoma House of Representatives